Bedford Township is the name of some places in the U.S. state of Michigan:

 Bedford Charter Township, Michigan in Calhoun County, Michigan
 Bedford Township, Monroe County, Michigan

See also 
 Bedford Township (disambiguation)

Michigan township disambiguation pages